Subaşı (old name: İskaristi) is a village in the Hopa District, Artvin Province, Turkey. Its population is 260 (2021).

References

Villages in Hopa District
Laz settlements in Turkey